Graphium encelades is a species of butterfly in the family Papilionidae. It is endemic species found only in Sulawesi.

Status
Not uncommon and said not to be threatened.

See also
List of butterflies of Sulawesi

References

External links

Butterfly corner Images from Naturhistorisches Museum Wien

encelades
Butterflies described in 1836